Meridian Lossless Packing, also known as Packed PCM (PPCM), is a lossless compression technique for PCM audio data developed by Meridian Audio, Ltd. MLP is the standard lossless compression method for DVD-Audio content (often advertised with the Advanced Resolution logo) and typically provides about 1.5:1 compression on most music material.  All DVD-Audio players are equipped with MLP decoding, while its use on the discs themselves is at their producers' discretion.

Dolby TrueHD, used in Archival Disc Blu-ray and HD DVD, employs MLP, but compared with DVD-Audio, adds higher bit rates, 8 full-range channels, extensive metadata, and custom speaker placements (as specified by SMPTE).

MLP in packaged media formats

See also
 Direct Stream Transfer
 FLAC
 Monkey's Audio
 TTA
 WavPack
 Master Quality Authenticated

References

External links
Dolby TrueHD announcement
Meridian Lossless Packing (MLP) in a Nutshell
"MLP Lossless Compression" by Bob Stuart of Meridian Audio, Ltd.
MLP on MultimediaWiki

Lossless audio codecs
DVD